The 2023 Pro Golf Tour will be the 27th season of the Pro Golf Tour (formerly the EPD Tour), one of the third-tier tours recognised by the European Tour.

Schedule
The following table lists official events during the 2023 season.

Notes

References

Pro Golf Tour
Pro Golf Tour